The weightlifting competition at the 1984 Summer Olympics in Los Angeles consisted of ten weight classes. The 1984 Summer Olympics boycott meant that the most dominant forces in weightlifting at the time, the USSR and Bulgaria did not take part. This left the field wide open.

Medal summary

Medal table

See also
 Weightlifting at the Friendship Games

References

Sources
 

 
1984 Summer Olympics events
1984
1984 in weightlifting